Shalini Pandey (born 23 September 1993) is an Indian actress who works in Telugu, Tamil and Hindi films. She made her acting debut in the Telugu film Arjun Reddy (2017), and has since acted in the Tamil film 100% Kadhal (2019), the Telugu films Mahanati (2018) and 118 (2019), and the Hindi film Jayeshbhai Jordaar (2022). Pandey ranked 19th in Hyderabad Times Most Desirable Women List of 2017.

Early life
Pandey was born on 23 September 1993 in Jabalpur, Madhya Pradesh.

Career

Debut and breakthrough (2017-2019)
Pandey started her career in a theater in Jabalpur. She made her film debut with the Telugu film Arjun Reddy in 2017 opposite Vijay Deverakonda. She did her own dubbing, though she doesn't speak Telugu fluently. The film was a commercial success and she received SIIMA Award for Best Female Debut (Telugu) nomination for her performance as Preethi.

She then appeared in a Cameo appearance in the Hindi film Meri Nimmo in 2018. The same year she appeared in the successful Telugu film Mahanati.

Pandey had five releases in 2019. She played Sowcar Janaki in Telugu film NTR: Kathanayakudu. She then appeared in Telugu film 118 which was a commercial success. In October 2019, Pandey made her Tamil debut with 100% Kadhal. alongside G. V. Prakash Kumar. It became a box office failure. Her last two release of the year came with the Tamil film Gorilla and Telugu film Iddari Lokam Okate.

Recent work (2020-present)
Pandey made her Hindi film debut in 2020 with the ZEE5 film Bamfaad alongside Aditya Rawal. She then appeared in the Telugu-Tamil bilingual Nishabdham.

In 2022, she portrayed Mudra, a Gujarati mother opposite Ranveer Singh in Jayeshbhai Jordaar.

Pandey will next appear in Junaid Khan's Maharaja for which she started filming in 2021.

In the media
Pandey ranked 19th in Hyderabad Times Most Desirable Women List of 2017.

Filmography

Film

Television

Music video

Discography

Awards and nominations

References

External links

 

1994 births
Living people
Indian film actresses
Indian Hindus
Actresses in Telugu cinema
Actresses in Tamil cinema
Actresses in Hindi cinema
Indian television actresses
Actresses in Hindi television
Actresses from Madhya Pradesh
People from Jabalpur
21st-century Indian actresses
Zee Cine Awards Telugu winners